Okuniikappu Dam  is an arch dam located in Hokkaido Prefecture in Japan. The dam is used for power production. The catchment area of the dam is 179.1 km2. The dam impounds about 33  ha of land when full and can store 6665 thousand cubic meters of water. The construction of the dam was started on 1958 and completed in 1963.

References

Dams in Hokkaido